FK Linköping was a Swedish football club located in Linköping, which replaced Linköpings FF from the 2009 season.

In 2013 the club was replaced by FC Linköping City.

Background
Since their foundation in 2009 FK Linköping participated in a middle division of the Swedish football league system. They played their home matches at the Folkungavallen in Linköping.

Season to season

Footnotes

External links
 FK Linköping – Official website

Fk
Football clubs in Östergötland County
Association football clubs established in 2009
2009 establishments in Sweden